Pseudopsinae is a beetle subfamily of Staphylinidae.

Anatomy
longitudinal carinae or costae on the head, pronotum, elytra, and sometimes head. 
fine stridulatory file one either side of the genital segment.
tarsi 5-5-5, one species 3-3-3.

Ecology
Habitat: found in fungi, forest leaf litter, flood debris, moss along streams, dung, and mammal nests.
Collection Method: sift/Berlese leaf litter.
Biology: poorly known.

Systematics
Four genera and 12 species in North America.

References

External links

Pseudopsinae at Bugguide.net. 

Staphylinidae